Pocket God is a series of digital and paperback comic books–strips, published and marketed by Ape Entertainment and iVerse Media, released for iOS devices, and available as a print on August 3, 2010. The comic is created and plotted by Dave Castelnuovo and Allan Dye, written by Jason M. Burns and drawn by Rolando Mallada. It describes in the comic about "an indestructible race of people who inhabit a mysterious island and are continuously (and comically) tortured by their mischievous gods". The comic is based on the best selling iOS application Pocket God, created by Bolt Creative's Allan Dye and Dave Castelnuovo. The tribe, 'Ookga Chaka', is based also off the game, with the Pygmies, Ooga, Klik, Klak, Booga, Dooby, and Nooby.

There are currently nineteen comics, including a special Christmas issue, Xmas Marks the Spot, and fourteen 'behind-the-scenes' comics, named The Pygmy Peril. Although Bolt Creative had stated they were going to only publish four comics, in The Pygmy Peril, however, they stated they were to publish more comics, due to popular demand. Pocket God is rated for "mature readers" and "teen and up", currently, due to violence.

According to iVerse Media, Pocket God is the first original iOS game to have its own comic series.

A sneak preview of the comic was released on the official website on May 7, 2010, an almost full three months before it was released, stating about the series, and who is involved.

Due to financial troubles at Ape Entertainment the comic was put on hiatus and cancellation. It's unknown whether or not the comics will return.

However, from November 2, 2019, the comics have started to reemerge on the WebToons website, being posted gradually in sections by its creators. If successful, the creators have hinted at continuing the storyline.

Setting
The comics are set around six pygmies, named Ooga, Klik, Klak, Booga, Dooby and Nooby, all form their tribe, Oogka Chaka, and are always loyal to their gods, with the exception to Ooga, who thinks worshipping the gods is a waste of time, and does not believe in them. Regardless of Ooga's thoughts, the tribe, Klik mainly, still believe and honour them. The story is set on a small archipelago of islands, approximately 200 Mya (million years ago, set in the Triassic period), when the super continent Pangaea was still formed. According to the game, the islands are located in the Panthalassic Ocean, opposite Pangaea. It is set mainly on Oog Island, the home of the tribe. It is a relatively small island, with a small type of forest. When the Gem of Life faded its colour, the Pygmies travel to an unnamed island, with a large rainforest and a hidden temple. Inside the temple is an Egyptian-like setting, with hieroglyphic writing on its walls. The temple is almost like an Indiana Jones setting, especially when Nooby discovers a hat, (resembling a Fedora). According to Ooga, the islands are located in the tropics.

Plot

The Gem of Life (August – December 2010)
The Gem of Life consists of four parts, in a total of the first four issues, it revolves around the entire tribe as they attempt to return the Gem of Life to its original pedestal, after Nooby clumsily causes their pedestal to be destroyed.

Part 1
The comic begins with a meteor hurdling towards Earth, while the tribe is circled around a type of totem pole, holding a gem. The tribe is honouring the gods by offering them large amounts of fish. Much to his boredom, Ooga catches his eye on the meteor that is heading straight for him. He then asks dim-witted Nooby to swap places with him. He agrees, then almost immediately, he is crushed by the meteor, killing him. Klak tries to spear the meteor, resulting the spear to ricochet off it then hit Klak in the chest. The rest, except Ooga, are executed from a chain reaction. The next day, Ooga and Klik have an argument why Ooga keeps disrupting 'the pygmy way'. Klik then explains that their ancestors discovered the Gem of Life, and brought it back to Oog Island and gave them something that they have never could have hoped for, or, in Ooga's terms, asked for. Klik tells him to grow up.  Meanwhile, a great white shark with what is described as a military nitrogen laser, approaches the island. Meanwhile, Booga is having trouble trying to light a fire on the meteor that crashed earlier; and volunteers Nooby to gather firewood. As Nooby walks into the small forest, he finds an anthill with an ant on top of it. As Nooby talks to it, Up above in a coconut tree, Ooga spills coconut milk onto Nooby. Back at the meteor, Booga asks where he is. Nooby then runs out of the forest, with hundreds of fire ants crawling on him. He then manages to kill himself, Booga and Nooby. Klak then emerges; and after eating a part of a fish head, he suddenly screams towards the sea and submerges his head underwater. The "Shark with Laser" then lurks towards him. As it prepares to eat him, an octopus grabs Klak, and eats him. The next day, the pygmies have a tribe meeting discussing their mortality. He is then interrupted by Nooby, who needs to go to the outhouse. Lightning strikes on the outhouse and he runs out, trying to hold up his grass skirt, while so. he then hides behind the totem pole, with it holding the Gem of Life, and the lightning strikes the pole, snapping it in half. Klik, shocked, exclaims that the gods will 'cast us away once and for all', when the Gem of Life is removed from its pedestal. Klik comes up with a plan to make the gods forgive them, but all but Ooga end up electrocuted. Klik, delusional, but correct, then sees the now discoloured gem and is shocked to say that when the colour drains from the gem, the next time they die, it will be forever.

Part 2
Klik and the tribe, much to the dismay of Ooga, journey to the neighbouring island to return the Gem of Life to its original pedestal. The "Shark With Laser" shoots a laser through their raft after they had been in the water for countless hours. They all "abandon ship". They resurface to find that Dooby has been captured by the shark. Ooga rescues him, by throwing a spear into the shark's laser beam, electrocuting itself. When they both resurface, immediately they are pulled by a tsunami, and crash on the island beach. While in the jungle, they arrive to a field of banana skins. A pack of apes terrorise the tribe and Klik is caught by one, and killed. Ooga then realises that, since the gem's power has disappeared, Klik is now deceased forever, by that one part of the gem is now a dark grey.  After the tribe craft a tombstone for Klik, Ooga decides that he will return the gem of life for Klik, with the approval of everyone, except Booga, who looks pale and delirious. A bug had sucked blood out of him, from his back. Ooga then rips it off of Booga, throws it on the ground, then jumps onto it, with a "bloody" result. Ooga then thinks he needs some food to regain his health, and immediately, Nooby rolls out a gigantic egg, claiming it is a chicken egg. Then a Tyrannosaurus rex emerges, extremely in aggravation.

Part 3
As the five remaining pygmies are evading the T. Rex, Klak suggests that they run in serpentine. Shortly after, Dooby is caught by his grass skirt by the Rex's mouth. Ooga then throws a spear, narrowly missing Dooby, but hitting the skirt instead, falling to the ground, naked. Dooby falls on Nooby, while trying to catch him. The tribe is disgusted that he is not wearing anything. The dinosaur returns, and the pygmies run into a cave, stopping the dinosaur in its tracks. Klak passes Dooby a bunch of leaves to cover himself up, and then asks how they are going to get rid of the reptile. Ooga asks Booga if he knows how to get rid of it, but he doesn't respond. Ooga approaches Booga and asks if he is alright, and Booga appears to be wrapped under snake skin. Ooga looks at the gem, and another sixth of it is now grey, resulting that Booga is dead. A giant snake had eaten him, and the Pygmies run out of the cave.

Dooby is flabbergasted and in excitement after discovering a whole field of what appears to be Psilocybin mushrooms. Dooby is then crushed by the dinosaur's foot, leaving only Ooga, Klak, and Nooby alive. They run towards a cliff, ultimately falling off it. They fall into the water, beside the temple, and Ooga and Klak find that Nooby is being chased by a pack of piranhas. The Laser Shark shoots the piranhas, not knowing it has let the pygmies escape. When on land, they discover the temple, but there is a puzzle to open the entrance. Klak and Ooga are stumped, but to their surprise, Nooby cracks the puzzle in seconds. Inside, Ooga finds a skeleton of a pygmy, still wearing its hat, a bag and a wooden sword. Ooga takes the bag, and the sword, while Nooby takes the hat. Ooga then realises that Klak has disappeared, and shouts for him. Klak responds, and they see that Klak is stuck in an unusually large cobweb.

Part 4
As Ooga fights to free Klak from the web, an extremely large barking spider emerges behind them. Nooby starts singing "Itsy Bitsy Spider" when it lands in front of them. They throw themselves away from the beast as it jumps towards them. It then cocoons Klak, who is still stuck. Nooby then says that he rips the legs off smaller spiders and "watch legless balls wriggle". Ooga gets the idea and quickly uses his sword to chop off the spider's eight legs. As Nooby and Ooga try to get Klak out of the cocoon, another fraction of the gem has faded to grey, indicating he has suffocated in the cocoon, but as they rip it open, dozens of baby barking spiders crawl out and chase them. They run off again, both agreeing that they are tired of doing so. As they exit, they push a large circular door to stop the spiders from getting to them.  As Ooga explains they are the last hope of getting the gem to the gods, Nooby tells that he didn't believe in them though. Ooga says he does now, but he thinks the gods don't believe in them, and how they deserve to know why the gods are always killing them. As he reaches in his bag, Ooga finds a journal, it reads:

I have travelled once again to this island to uncover the true nature of that which the gods have bestowed upon us.I have witnessed a side of their generosity that seems more sinister than sincere.Their gift not only promises eternal life, but from what I have seen, eternal death as well.

As Ooga questions what 'eternal death' means, a zombified hand smashes up from the ground. As Nooby says that he doesn't like scary stories, four zombies come up from the ground. They are the zombified remains of Klik, Booga, Dooby, and Klak, all exclaiming "brains!". Nooby is excited that his friends are back, obviously not realizing they are zombies. Ooga tries to pull back Nooby, exclaiming that they are monsters. Nooby then says that the entire tribe said that Ooga was a monster anyway, except for Nooby. He breaks out of Ooga's grip, and runs towards the zombie pygmies. Ooga then screams for him to come back. As the four zombie pygmies tear the top of Nooby's head off, they question "Brains?" And a shot to a dead Nooby with the top of his head hinging off, there is no brain found in him. As they look at each other, they suddenly look at Ooga, exclaiming more angrily, as how Ooga treated them previously. Ooga, upset, says that it was all is fault for everything, and he failed to return the Gem of Life. As he is saying this, he falls through a hidden trap. He falls through into a chamber, inside the volcano, with five differently coloured organisms, revealing it is the gods. As Ooga asks what they are, the purple god obnoxiously says 'What do we look like, numb nards?', the yellow god tells him to calm down, as he has come a long way. Ooga asks what it all means, life, the red god says "that's not exactly our field of enterprise". Ooga then asks "If you don't know the meaning of life, why do you tamper with ours?" They then say it's not tampering, its fun. He is then confused, then asks why the Gem is dying. They say they have to wait for the next update, but then says that he has to return it to its original pedestal, before they become "nothing more than a Wikipedia page memory". As he walks across the unstable bridge, he asks for all of them back, even Klik. he puts the gem on the pedestal, and walks back, as he is, the laser shark emerges from a small part of the water, shooting a laser at the bridge making Ooga fall towards the magma. Before he does, however, he immediately asks why they were born when there are no female pygmies on the island. They reply, "Who said anything about you being born?". When Ooga falls into the magma, the Volcano erupts.

Back on the home island, Booga, Klak, Klik, Nooby, and Dooby, pop out of mid-air, alive. Then Ooga. Klik then proceeds to say, that Ooga somehow has saved them and appeased the gods as well. As a wave crashes on the island, the Gem of Life is found.

Xmas Marks the Spot (December 18, 2010)
Set after the events of The Gem of Life, released on December 18, 2010, with version 1.4 on iOS. The issue is the Christmas special of the series, introducing two characters to the series, Red, and Newbie.

A Tale of Two Pygmies (March – August 2011)
The second story arc, A Tale of Two Pygmies was released between 30 March, and 3 August 2011, with the eighth issue being released one year since the initial release of the comics. The three-part comic describes how Ooga and Klik's rivalry exceeds towards "catastrophe", and as a result, Ooga ends up being banished from the tribe. With Booga and Nooby joining him on the opposite side of Oog Island, they initiate a plan to steal the Gem of Life from Klik's possession. Klik, after realising that it has been stolen, immediately blames Ooga and engages in a battle, which leads to Nooby discovering another Pygmy, Sun, a female Pygmy, who was in search of the "Jewel of Life", and explains that she had retrieved the Gem. Attempting to escape, Ooga and Klik, who had called a truce, managed to take back the Gem and capture Sun. The epilogue of the final issue shows Newbie, exclaiming, he had survived death from the fifth issue.

"Infestation"

A Quest Called Tribe (September – December 2011)

Part 1
At the beginning of this comic, Klik is visited in a dream by an owl god who tells him that Sun holds clues to the fate of the tribe. He wakes up and goes to find Sun, who has been kept as a prisoner in a  makeshift bamboo cell. However, Nooby, who finds Sun attractive, takes her out to watch the sun rise with him, essentially "watching the sun while watching Sun". He also made her a decorated leg bone for her hair. When Ooga finds the two on the beach and scolds Nooby, Sun lies that she tricked Nooby into taking her out so that Nooby would not be blamed. Klik arrives at the scene and declares that all previous events were results of misconceptions, and that they should be helping Sun instead of holding her captive. At a tribe meeting, she informs the boys that her tribe's Jewel of Life had been stolen by Newbie and that the members had split up, following different techniques in hopes of finding it. Though Ooga is against the idea, feeling that Sun is leading them on, Klik insists that they bring Sun back home, believing that it wound answer and create questions about their existence.
As they set out, Sun discloses that as she was following Newbie, she passed a seemingly bare and tiny island that Newbie disappeared onto. As they approach this island, they are immediately attacked by an enormous octopus, whose likeness is represented by a small statue on the island. As it captures them and begins to consume the pygmies, Klik reveals that he brought along the Gem, which outrages Ooga. At the last minute, the Tyrannosaurus rex "Chicken" in his zombie form resurfaces from under the ocean and attacks the octopus, allowing the pygmies an escape. Ooga reprimands Klik for bringing along the Gem, claiming that it was irresponsible and that he had led them on a pointless mission. He gives Nooby the gem, explaining that even Nooby couldn't be any more careless with it. As Ooga and Klik continue to argue, Nooby jams the gem into a hole in the statue, uncovering a secret passageway below the ground. Sun speculates that Newbie used the girl's Jewel to unlock the door and escape, and they all descend into the chamber.
They find themselves in a cavern full of glowing plants, but at what appears to be a dead end, as the only other exit is through a diving pool. However, Nooby's curiosity proves to be productive again; he takes one of the plants and puts it over his head. Klik examines the plant, discovering that it adheres to the head and exudes oxygen. Taking advantage of this knowledge, they use the plants as a sort of scuba gear and continue their journey into the water. As they pass through large caves with mysterious carvings, they find an opening through which they see a large temple in the distance. Sun is convinced that this is the next step of their journey.

Part 2
The tribe and Sun stare at the temple, but find there is no entry to it. The walls have too many holes in different directions. Sun suggests that they have to search all of them until they can find the right one. Ooga stops her and states that she shouldn't order them around. Sun retaliates by saying Ooga is a "whiny baby man". Klik stops the arguing and shouts that Sun should appreciate them more because they are helping them, otherwise they would head back. So the group keeps going, while Ooga states that he didn't need Klik's help. Klak notices that the holes in the ocean walls don't look natural and that they were made by someone. While no one is looking, Booga is grabbed by a tentacle. As they go deeper, Ooga states it will take them forever to get out, but Sun says they still need to keep looking.  However, Klik points out that the plants they are wearing have a limited amount of oxygen and they only have 20 minutes of it left. Sun notices Booga missing. Nooby looks in one of the holes and he is grabbed by another tentacle. Soon many tentacles come out and try to grab the group. Klik says that it's the creature that made the holes in the wall. Klak and Dooby are grabbed. They swim to a nearby hole and see one of Sun's missing tribe members, Kinsee, stuck in a trap. Klik finds the way to free Kinsee from the trap, but the creature finds the group. Klik, Ooga, and Sun go and try to free Kinsee, but she points out that it's too late. Ooga lets go of one of the levers in anger and the trap activates into a whirlpool. As they get sucked in, Nooby gets caught by the creature. Ooga tries to save Nooby, but he gets caught by the creature himself. Sun cuts the creature's tongue using a nearby stalagmite, but Ooga still tries to free Nooby. Nooby, happy that Ooga likes him enough to save him, decides to die happy and lets go of Ooga. Nooby gets eaten by the creature. Sun and Ooga keep arguing as they float down. As the group wonders what to do next, Klik who hit his head while in the whirlpool, has another dream with the dream creature again. The creature tells him that things are changing and if they don't stop Newbie by sundown EVERYONE is in danger. Klik wakes up in a giant bubble. Ooga explains that a group of sentient creatures known as the Bubble Breathing People have helped them. The leader, King Dumas, says that Newbie came in and pillaged their sacred mine for the gems. So Klik agrees to try to help reclaim the stones. Ooga wonders why Nooby didn't regenerate. Nooby is shown ok, after being dropped out of the creature's "bottom mouth". A stranger in a scuba suit comes and tells Nooby to be quiet. He explains that he is a hunter, who also made that whirlpool trap Kinsee was in, trying to catch the creature (Blob fish) for food. Suddenly someone points a stake at Nooby.

Para-abnormal Activity (Issue 14)

Gem Cell Research (Issue 15-19)

Main characters
The characters in the comic, are Pygmies, which are unusually small. They have their hair tied up with a bone, wearing a grass skirt, or kilt, tanned skin, large eyes, and a large head. Comically, it seems to look that none of them have noses. The following six characters make up the tribe Oogka Chaka.

Male Tribe

Ooga
Ooga is the "reluctant" leader of the 'Oogka Chaka' tribe. He is monstrously mischievous towards the others and usually causes their deaths. Ooga looks the most similar to the Pocket God game, the only major difference is he has blue eyes, instead of the usual brown. Ooga does not respect the tribe very much, and does not believe in the gods. Ooga loathes Klik, because of his frequent conversations about the gods. Ooga is unbelievably selfish, but when Klik picks on someone for doing something wrong, Ooga stands up against Klik. Most likely because he dislikes Klik. Ooga only gets along with Nooby, whose intelligence is limited and never takes negative subjects seriously, nor positively. Nooby tell Ooga that the entire tribe says that he's a monster, but that he doesn't listen to them. Although Ooga treats him the same as everyone else, Ooga is called by, Nooby, his 'bestest friend'.

Klik
Klik is the most intelligent Pygmy of the tribe, he respects everyone, except Ooga, because he does not believe in the gods. Once again, Klik's description is very close to the game, with brown eyes, but the major difference is his glasses, which are usually banked on the top of his head. This shows his intelligence. Klik usually picks on Ooga and Nooby for the stupid things they have done, like Ooga, for not believing in the gods, and Nooby, for his stupidity. Like bringing a coconut with a face drawn on it called  Wilson. Klik thinks Ooga is a monster, along with everyone in the tribe aside from Nooby. Klik is one of the only Pygmies in the tribe who somewhat respects what Dooby has to say, like 'if it was meant to be, it was meant to be'.

Dooby
Dooby is described as a 'Rastafarian hippy' pygmy, he is more relaxed and is always positive that the gods will turn their ways and gift them. Dooby is known to use the word 'dude' after he says a name of someone, e.g.. 'Whoa, calm down, Klik dude'. He is the only pygmy (other than Nooby) in the tribe that does not hate anyone, though he does agree that Ooga is a monster. Dooby constantly reminds Booga to be patient, and at one time, Booga cracks under Dooby's constant reminders to him and the tribe, and screams 'Bull Shark!', an alternative to the similar swear. Dooby looks significantly different than the game counterpart, with dreadlocks instead of a ponytail, which is held up by a bone flute. His facial expression looks more relaxed, less alert, and sports a gold necklace.

Klak
Klak is a cheerful, and unlucky pygmy, the most major difference to him in the comics and in the game is that in the comic he is chubby, and constantly searches for food. The bone in his hair is significantly smaller than the others, comically showing that he is more afraid of dangers than anyone else. Klak usually backs up Booga's remarks, usually standing beside him while doing so. Like all of the tribe, except Nooby, he thinks that Ooga is a monster, but he does not dislike him like most of the tribe. Other than Nooby, he is killed more than any other pygmy in the tribe. He is almost always killed unusually, e.g.. He eats a fish that is too hot and sprints to the water and throws his head in to cool down. Then, a shark with what looks like a military nitrogen laser slowly lurks towards him, almost like Jaws, but before the shark gets its chance, Klak is caught by a giant octopus and is eaten alive.

Nooby
Nooby is a, somewhat, lucky pygmy (according to himself), and he has the lowest mental intelligence in the tribe. He speaks almost entirely in illeism, e.g. 'Ooga mad at Nooby?'. His appearance is again similar to the game, the most difference is that his hair bone has broken off one side, and he has two buck teeth with a wide gap between them. He is always cheerful. In The Pygmy Peril, it is revealed that he becomes easily confused when in a conversation, and that he is best friends with Ooga. Although the tribe thinks of Ooga as a monster, Nooby says that he does not listen to them. Although he is dim-witted, he can be significantly smart in certain situations, such as when Ooga, and Klak were trying to decode a puzzle, and Nooby easily cracks it within seconds.

Booga
Booga is a constantly aggravated pygmy, showing the most difference in appearance than in the game. Instead of wearing a grass skirt/kilt, he wears a type of cloth, possibly a rag, and instead of the normal, 'dog bone', he wears a type of horn to hold up his hair. He is unshaven, unclean, and has a tattoo on his right arm of a bone. He is not easily distracted, and is immediately negative to most circumstances, such as when Dooby says, 'If it's meant to be, it's meant to be', after the gem is discoloured, Booga then proceeds to yell 'Bull shark!' (to avoid the use of profane language). While Booga agrees that Ooga is a monster, he states in A Tale of Two Pygmies that he would rather be led by Ooga; mainly because he has increased charisma and doesn't talk as much as Klik.

Female Tribe
In the eighth comic, the end of the "Tale of Two Pygmies" story arc, the first female pygmy, Sun, was introduced. She hinted towards the rest of her tribe, which is essentially the male tribe's female counterparts, with some changes. The tribe was introduced one at a time at first, but the remaining three were shown all at once. The arrival of female pygmies sparked romance, arguments, and even eventually led to Nooby abandoning the tribe, only to return in the same issue.

Sun
"The Adventurous One".

Sun is the first female to appear in the comics. She is overall quite similar in shape to the other pygmies, though her skin is slightly darker. She also has blonde hair that is tied up in two ponytails and wears a longer grass skirt along with a top made of white shells. Like Ooga, her eyes are blue. She is adventurous, seemingly short tempered and very loyal to her friends. At first, her and Ooga seemed to hardly get along, but as the comics progressed, they became closer. Also like Ooga, Sun was at first relatively uncooperative but began taking initiative whenever her tribe was in peril. She first showed skepticism towards the male tribe, particularly Nooby, whom she confused for someone who had wronged her (this person was coincidentally an almost exact replica of Nooby). In time, she began to warm up to her new friends, particularly Ooga, much to other pygmies' (Kinsee and Nooby) anger or disappointment.

Teela
"The Science Nerd".

Teela is a pygmy from the female tribe who plays a similar role to Klik's. She was simultaneously introduced to the series along with Linsee and Toola. Although it's hard to tell when next to the female pygmies, Teela seems to be slightly shorter than the other tribe members (of both the male and female tribe). She has brown hair and two pigtails held by small bones. Like Klik, she sports a pair glasses but instead of having them on top of her head like Klik, she wears them in the usual style. The glasses are also rectangular in shape and have a white strip of cloth in the nose bridge (to represent how "nerdy" she is). Teela also wears a leaf skirt with a leaf top. Teela is shown to be quite smart like Klik, but unlike him, she does not believe in the Gods and usually talks about scientific subjects rather than divinity. Despite her capabilities, she is picked on by the other members of her tribe, as opposed to Klik, who is respected among his peers. As time progresses, however, she gains more recognition from her fellow tribe members and the male tribe. She was also the first pygmy that was believed to have permanently died, after she was accidentally killed by Linsee (her revival had a plot related delay).

Toola
"The Hottie".

Toola is a female pygmy and a member of Sun's tribe. Unlike Sun, Moon, or Kinsee, Toola was not introduced to the series individually, instead first appearing along Teela and Linsee.  Like Sun, she has blue eyes with long, blonde hair that is tied up into a long ponytail; her hair also sticks out in the form of a few bangs. Toola seems to be the only pygmy that wears both makeup and lipstick, and as such, is the only one that has visible lips. She also does not have a pale spot around her mouth like the other pygmies; in later issues this spot appears and the lipstick is not present. Instead of a leaf skirt, she wears a blue piece of cloth similar to Booga's but considerably longer (and without rags), with a string of gold beads around the waist area. Toola also sports a top made of what seem to be coconuts. From her time in the comics, Toola seems to be quite superficial to some extent, as she occasionally gets concerned about her appearance, evidenced when Toola kept worrying about her hair while trekking. She is also quite fond of her beauty, even describing it as a weapon at one point. Despite this, Toola is shown to be very mother-like, and is willing to help her peers when the time is needed; it is mentioned she is considerably skilled in medicine. Similar to Dooby, she is very hippie-like in demeanor. Toola also seems to speak in a different manner, as she replaces the ending of words that end with "-er" to "-ah" (i.e. the word "never" is changed to "nevah") and often includes the word "like" in the middle of her sentences.

Moon
"The Goth Girl and Thrill-Seeker".

Moon is the third female pygmy to appear in the comic series and is a member of Sun's tribe. A "goth" pygmy, she is pale skinned, and sports a red cloth skirt along with a red leaf top. Her hair is black with a blue stripe on a bang that covers one of her eyes. Instead of a ponytail, she has the top of her hair in a frizzy bun that is held by a thin stick and a small skull. Moon also has a short necklace with a silver bead in the middle. Moon, similar to Sun, is a bit of a troublemaker, and can also be very bossy. She can also be very rough in demeanor (she states that she "hates mushy feelings"), as well as very bold. Because of her rough nature, she isn't that much of a sensible person; this is shown when she tried to cheer up a downtrodden Klak by threatening to hurt him if he didn't feel happier, and later answering to his sob story with a "So what?".  Moon is also a bit of an adventurer, as evidenced when she tried to cheer up Klak by exploring the island with him and later making him do various stunts (at Klak's expense). But as both Klak and Moon spent time together, they became close friends; Klak even gained a bit more confidence thanks to Moon's help, as he seemed to be more secure and commanding during the progression of the comics.

Linsee
"The Party Girl".

Linsee is a member of Sun's tribe. She was introduced along with Teela and Toola simultaneously. Her appearance is quite different to that of other pygmies, as she is the only one with red hair and green eyes. Her hair is tied into a low ponytail and on the top of her head she has a yellow, star shaped clip and small claw similar to the horn Booga wears. Her top and skirt are made of yellow grass, accompanied by a pearl necklace. For a short period in the comics, she wears an anklet that Teela forcibly placed on her. Not much is told about Linsee's personality outside the fact that she has a penchant for drinking, particularly fermented coconut milk. This results in her inebriation, with Linsee becoming relatively careless or somewhat hostile when so; she also hiccups a lot as a result. Other pygmies, particularly Teela, worried about her well being, despite Linsee never really caring for such. At one point, Teela put an anklet on Linsee that was allegedly rigged to blow up if she ever drank again. In an attempt to remove the Anklet with an acquired laser, Linsee accidentally kills Teela (albeit temporarily), which causes Linsee to fall in despair, constantly blaming herself for her friend's death. After Teela's unexpected return, Linsee learns that the exploding anklet was a bluff.

Kinsee
"The Boy-Hater"

Kinsee is the second female pygmy to be showcased in the comics. Like Moon, she has black, short hair with a stripe on it; the only difference is that her hair is cut in a bob style and the stripe is purple and located on her ponytail. This ponytail was longer in her first appearances but is later cut by Sun in an attempt to save her from a monster (that was holding Kinsee by the hair). Kinsee also wears a light beige top with a rag skirt of the same color. Kinsee has misandrist tendencies, quickly becoming hostile towards the male tribe upon their arrival. She holds a particular grudge against Ooga and Booga, as the former allegedly stole her best friend (Sun) and the latter, due to his brutish demeanor, is seen as "annoying". Kinsee eventually warms up to the majority of the male tribe (Booga seems to still be at odds with her). This is shown when she and Nooby get captured: When Kinsee was tortured by one of her enemies, Nooby stood up for her. After this, she manages to escape, promising Nooby she would rescue him before promptly dying on purpose (she jumps on a floor full of spikes), thus spawning back with her group and leading them to where Nooby was located.

Cancellation 
Due to financial troubles at Ape Entertainment, the comic was cancelled before releasing the 26th issue. The creators wanted to be able to continue the comics, but the contract was up in the air so its unknown whether or not Pocket God Comics will ever continue.

Reception
Within a week after the comic was released, it was met with generally positive reviews from many websites and critics. The comic quickly reached the top 25 in the App Store, and peaking at number 1 in the books category. Review websites such as App Advice praise the comic for its engagement, interface and overall capability, but criticised it for its short storyline, quoting "Minus the title page, instructions, and credits this is a 20 page comic... it goes by so quickly, and there’s nothing left to do with it." App Advice gave the comic four and a half stars. 148Apps gave the comic 4 out of 5 stars.

References

External links
iVerse Media website
Ape Entertainment website
Official Pocket God website
Pocket God Forums

Comics based on video games
2010 comics debuts